Clough–Ballacolla is a Gaelic Athletic Association club in County Laois, Ireland. The colour of the club jersey is all blue with a gold band.

History
Since its founding in the late 19th century, the club has changed its name a number of times and was previously known as Ballygeehan, St Canice's, Cannonswood, Ballacolla.

From 1914 to 1918, hurling was particularly strong the area with the Ballygeehan team winning the Laois Senior Hurling Championship, as well as supplying the bulk of the team in 1915 when Laois won its only All-Ireland Senior Hurling Championship.
Mick Aherne, a member of the Laois senior football and hurling teams of the 1980s, is one of the best known players the club has produced.

During the late 1990s and the 2000s Clough–Ballacolla won several titles in U/14, U/16, Minor and U-21. In 2009, Clough–Ballacolla won their first Laois Senior Hurling Championship title in 91 years. They beat Portlaoise in the final. In 2011, Clough–Ballacolla regained the Laois Senior Hurling Championship beating Portlaoise in the final. In 2015, Clough–Ballacolla regained the Laois Senior Hurling Championship beating Camross in the final.

Achievements

 All-Ireland Senior Hurling Championship:  1915
 Leinster Senior Hurling Championship: 1915
 Laois Senior Hurling Championship: 1914, 1915, 1916, 1917, 1918, 2009, 2011, 2015, 2020, 2021, 2022
 Laois Intermediate Hurling Championship: 1910, 1913, 1938, 1952, 1957, 1972, 1991, 1998,2022
 Laois Junior A Hurling Championship: 1909, 1929, 1937, 1949, 1950, 1980, 1990, 2007, 2015
 Laois Junior B Hurling Championship: 2004
 Laois Minor Hurling Championship: 1973, 2002, 2003, 2006
 All-County Football League Division 5: 2003

Notable players
Mick Aherne
Stephen Bergin
Lee Cleere
John A. Delaney
Willie Dunphy
Jack Finlay
Tom Finlay
Willie Hyland, captained Laois and represented Ireland in the Shinty–Hurling International Series. He retired in 2016.
Stephen Maher

References

Gaelic games clubs in County Laois
Hurling clubs in County Laois
Gaelic football clubs in County Laois